Chappargram or Chapargram (Urdu: چھپرگرام, Pashto: چھپرګراﻣ) is a village of Battagram District in Khyber-Pakhtunkhwa province of Pakistan. It is part of Ajmera Union Council and lies within Battagram Tehsil and is located about four kilometres from the district headquarters Battagram along the Shahrah-e-Resham (Karakoram Highway) or silk route.

Chappargram was one of the villages affected by the 2005 Kashmir earthquake of October 8, 2005 when more than 100 people were killed and approximately 500 were injured. Many residents of the village were rendered homeless and without shelter

Gallery

See also

 Ajmera
 Battagram District
 Battagram Tehsil
 Yusafzai
 Khyber-Pakhtunkhwa

References

External links
BATTAGRAM-District Profile ERRA
 "List of polling stations" – The Gazette of Pakistan
"NRC PAKISTAN EARTHQUAKE SITUATION REPORT – WEEK ENDING 5TH FEB 2006" – Norwegian Refugee Council
World Bank Document

Populated places in Battagram District